Command master chief petty officer (CMDCM) is an enlisted rating in the United States Navy and U.S. Coast Guard, as well as the Japan Maritime Self-Defense Force.

In the U.S. Navy, the command master chief petty officer is the senior enlisted advisor at a command and as such works as a liaison between the commanding officer and the enlisted ranks, serving as the senior enlisted leader. In this capacity, the CMDCM assists the commanding officer in issues of quality of life, discipline, training, and morale. Collectively, the CMDCM, commanding officer, and executive officer are referred to as the "big three".

Japan Maritime Self-Defense Force

Japan's navy, the Japanese Maritime Self-Defense Force (JMSDF), first established their command master chief petty officer program in 2003, modelling it on that of the U.S. Navy's.

United States Navy
A command master chief petty officer is the most senior enlisted sailor in a United States Navy unit. They advise their respective commander or Commanding Officer, and provide input in the formulation, implementation, and execution of policies concerning morale, welfare, job satisfaction, discipline, utilization, family support, and training of enlisted sailors, as well as providing input and advice in matters affecting mission and operations as required. In smaller units, this position may be filled by a command senior chief petty officer, a command chief petty officer, or a master chief petty officer who is not yet a command master chief. The rates force master chief petty officer (FORCM) and fleet master chief petty officer (FLTCM) are used for larger units such as U.S. Fleet Forces Command, Navy Expeditionary Combat Command, U.S. Pacific Fleet, and Submarine Force U.S. Atlantic Fleet. There are only four FLTCMs and 16 FORCMs in the U.S. Navy.

Background
First referenced in OPNAVINST 1306.2C dated 16 October 1995 (now 1306.2J), the Navy states that its command master chief program is ostensibly intended to stimulate free-flowing communications, and ensure the highest standards of professionalism are upheld at all levels within the chain of command. Command master chiefs strengthen the chain of command by keeping the commanding officer aware of existing or potential situations as well as procedures and practices which affect the mission, readiness, welfare and morale of the sailors in the command. CMDCMs are the senior enlisted leaders who report directly to the officer commanding the unit for which they are the CMDCM. They formulate and implement policies concerning morale, welfare, job satisfaction, discipline, utilization and training of navy personnel. By reporting directly to their commanding officer, the CMDCMs keep their chain of command aware and informed of sensitive and current issues.

The Bureau of Personnel assigns a CMDCM to commands with 250 or more enlisted manpower. All carrier-based air wing squadrons, deployable helicopter anti-submarine warfare light, helicopter combat support, and maritime patrol squadrons will have a CMDCM requirement regardless of size due to the complexity of their operations. Those commands that do not have enlisted manpower of 250 assign a CMDCM from within command resources on a collateral duty basis. In the absence of a master chief petty officer, a senior chief petty officer or chief petty officer may be assigned, such as with the s, which had the former during their lifespan with the U.S. Navy.

In 2015, the U.S. Navy formally established the rating of command senior chief petty officer (CMDCS), before it was a billet.

Submarines

The equivalent of a command master chief on U.S. Navy submarines is known as the "chief of the boat," or "COB". The COB has similar duties to that of a command master chief in a surface, aviation, or shore unit.

Insignia

The rank insignia of a command master chief petty officer consists of two silver stars, one perched eagle, one silver star taking the place of rating insignia, and one rocker above three chevrons.

United States Coast Guard

Like the U.S. Navy, the United States Coast Guard also utilizes the title and designation of command master chief. These individuals are also informally referred to as "gold badge" due to the insignia they wear.  Command master chiefs can be so designated either by the Commandant of the Coast Guard or the Master Chief Petty Officer of the Coast Guard.  One commandant-designated CMC is located at each area, each district, both maintenance and logistics commands, headquarters, the Coast Guard Academy, and the Deployable Operations Group.  One commandant-designated reserve command master chief is located at each area, each district, both maintenance and logistics commands.  One Master Chief Petty Officer of the Coast Guard-designated CMC is located at each training center, Coast Guard recruiting command, and the Personnel Service Center.

Insignia
The rate insignia of a command master chief petty officer consists of two silver stars, one perched eagle, one silver shield taking the place of rating insignia, and one rocker above three chevrons.

In popular culture
 In the 2014 TV series The Last Ship, the character Russell Jeter (portrayed by Charles Parnell) is the command master chief aboard the USS Nathan James and holds the rank of command master chief petty officer.

See also
 CPO command identification badge
 Master chief petty officer
 Senior chief petty officer
 Chief of the boat

Notes

References

External links
 U.S. Navy uniform regulations
 U.S. military enlisted ranks

Military ranks of the United States Coast Guard
Military ranks of the United States Navy
United States military enlisted ranks